Kendra Christine Coombes (born 1988) is a Canadian politician, who was elected to the Nova Scotia House of Assembly in a by-election on March 10, 2020. A member of the Nova Scotia New Democratic Party, she represents the electoral district of Cape Breton Centre-Whitney Pier.

Prior to her election to the Nova Scotia House of Assembly, she served on Cape Breton Regional Council, representing District 11 since the 2016 municipal elections.

Electoral record

References

Living people
Nova Scotia municipal councillors
Nova Scotia New Democratic Party MLAs
Women MLAs in Nova Scotia
21st-century Canadian politicians
21st-century Canadian women politicians
1988 births